Brayan Rojas (born 30 November 1997) is a Costa Rican footballer who plays for Herediano.

Career statistics

Club

References

1997 births
Living people
Costa Rican footballers
Costa Rican expatriate footballers
Association football forwards
Liga FPD players
Eliteserien players
A.D. Carmelita footballers
Tromsø IL players
C.S. Herediano footballers
Costa Rican expatriate sportspeople in Norway
Expatriate footballers in Norway
People from Naranjo (canton)